Hilton is a civil parish in the district of South Staffordshire, Staffordshire, England.  It contains five listed buildings that are recorded in the National Heritage List for England.  Of these, two are listed at Grade I, the highest of the three grades, and the others are at Grade II, the lowest grade.  The most important building in the parish is Hilton Hall, a country house which is listed at Grade I.  All the other listed buildings in the parish are associated with the house, or are in its grounds


Key

Buildings

References

Citations

Sources

Lists of listed buildings in Staffordshire
South Staffordshire District